The 2011 Judo Grand Slam Moscow was held in Moscow, Russia, from 27 to 29 May 2011.

Medal summary

Men's events

Women's events

Source Results

Medal table

References

External links
 

2011 IJF World Tour
2011 Judo Grand Slam
Judo
Judo competitions in Russia
Judo
Judo